Fővám tér is a station of Line 4 of the Budapest Metro, located beneath the eponymous square. The tunnels, on the other side of Szabadság Bridge, go under the Danube and continue in Pest under Corvinus University. The station was opened on 28 March 2014 as part of the inaugural section of the line, from Keleti pályaudvar to Kelenföld vasútállomás.

Connections
Bus: 15, 115
Trolleybus: 83M
Tram: 2, 2B, 2M, 47, 48, 49

References

External links
Official web page of the construction

M4 (Budapest Metro) stations
Railway stations opened in 2014
2014 establishments in Hungary